The year 1976 saw a number of significant events in radio broadcasting.


Events
September - Fairchild Industries sells WYOO-FM and AM in Minneapolis, Minnesota. The AM becomes WAYL and the FM station becomes a simulcast of KDWB
September 6: DWRT-FM (Manila, Philippines) signs on the air as 99.5 RT, and it became the first Top 40 station in the Philippines.
KXOL in Dallas, Texas flips from Top 40 to country music

Debuts
 January – WEMO (101.3 FM, now KUUL) of East Moline, Illinois signs on, formating a mix of light adult contemporary and middle of the road music.
 March 8 - Radio 210 (now Heart Berkshire) begins broadcasting to the Reading area.
 March 14 - 951 Remix begins broadcasting in Trinidad and Tobago as 95FM.
 March 16 - Downtown Radio, the first Independent Local Radio in Northern Ireland, begins broadcasting to the Belfast area.
 April 12 - Beacon Radio (now Free Radio Shropshire & Black Country) begins broadcasting to the Wolverhampton area; this is the final station in the first wave of Independent Local Radio stations to begin transmission.
 Unknown date - DWLS-FM, the flagship FM station of GMA Radio-Television Arts in the Philippines was launched with a jazz format.

Births
 January 3 - Angela Yee, former co-host of The Breakfast Club
 October 21 - Lindsay Brien, American radio personality in Atlanta, Georgia, entertainment reporter for Headline News, and part of MTV's The Real World Seattle season in 1998.
 December 21 - Clarence Black, Detroit, Michigan sports radio personality and contestant on Survivor Africa.
 Brody, American radio personality on WDGC-FM in Raleigh, North Carolina

Deaths
March 2 - Hollace Shaw, 62, American coloratura soprano on many old-time radio programs. 
March 24 - Nelson Case, 66, American radio announcer. 
June 25 - Jay Jostyn, 74, American radio and TV actor.
Santos Ortega, 76, American actor and comedian.

References

 
Radio by year